Leandro Damián Cufré (born 9 May 1978) is an Argentine former footballer who last played as a defender for Club Universidad de Guadalajara of the Liga MX and the most recent manager of Mexican club Atlas F.C.

Cufre won seventeen caps for Argentina national football team and was included in their squad for the 2006 FIFA World Cup.

Club career

Early career
Born in La Plata, Argentina, Cufré began his professional career at Gimnasia La Plata U-19 before being promoted to the first-team squad in January 1996. He went on to play 129 games, scoring four goals in the progress.

Roma
Cufré moved to A.S. Roma in January 2002. During his time at the Italia Serie A side, he played 80 games, scored two goals and received the award for Best Defender in Italy. He was also loaned out to fellow Italian side Siena, where he played 35 times.

Monaco
Cufré moved to France in Summer 2006, joining Ligue 1 side AS Monaco During his time at the club, he made 61 appearances and managed to score three goals. Cufré was a regular starter and, eventually, vice-captain of the team.

Hertha BSC
On 29 January 2009, Bundesliga side Hertha BSC announced that they had loaned Cufré from Monaco until the end of the 2008–09 season. He returned to Monaco in June 2009.

Gimnasia La Plata
On 18 July 2009, Cufré returned to Gimnasia La Plata after eight years in Europe. On 16 August 2009, after a mini "soap opera," the Argentine wingback asked for – and was granted – his release due to a conflictive relation with Leonardo Madelón, the head coach at the time (though, personal reasons were officially cited).

Dinamo Zagreb
On 19 August 2009, he officially signed a contract with Croatian champions Dinamo Zagreb who had reportedly been persuading him to join the club since the summer transfer window opened. Cufré became a favourite with the Dinamo fans because of his commitment on the pitch. He played in many important matches for Dinamo. In 2011, he was linked with a transfer to Crvena Zvezda (Red Star Belgrade) but the deal fell through. Cufre played in 53 matches for Dinamo. On 5 December Cufré and Dinamo agreed mutual termination of contract. Argentinian stated that he would be continuing his career in Mexico.

Club Atlas
On 7 December 2011, same day he officially terminated his contract with Dinamo Zagreb, it was revealed that Cufré would be joining Mexican Club Atlas from Guadalajara.

International career
Leandro Cufré has earned 17 caps for Argentina, his first appearance coming in 2000. He was part of the Argentina Under-20 team that won the 1997 FIFA World Youth Championship in Malaysia.

Cufré was also a member of the Argentina squad for the 2006 FIFA World Cup in Germany. On 30 June 2006, Cufré was red carded for violent conduct in an altercation following Argentina's loss on penalties to Germany in a quarter-final match. Germany's Per Mertesacker said Cufré, an unused substitute in the match, "attacked me even though I did not do anything. I have three or four red marks on my thigh and then he kicked me again in the groin." FIFA president Sepp Blatter said "I am furious about that and our disciplinary committee will monitor this incident. We will take some steps towards those who are identified as being the 'provocateurs' of this incident." FIFA fined Cufré CHF 10,000 and suspended him for four matches.

Honours
Dinamo Zagreb
Croatian First League: 2009–10, 2010–11
Croatian Cup: 2010–11

References

External links
 
 
 
 
 
 
 

1978 births
Living people
Argentine footballers
Argentine expatriate footballers
Argentina youth international footballers
Argentina under-20 international footballers
Argentina international footballers
Association football central defenders
Footballers from La Plata
A.S. Roma players
A.C.N. Siena 1904 players
Atlas F.C. footballers
AS Monaco FC players
Hertha BSC players
GNK Dinamo Zagreb players
Club de Gimnasia y Esgrima La Plata footballers
2006 FIFA World Cup players
Serie A players
Ligue 1 players
Argentine Primera División players
Liga MX players
Bundesliga players
Croatian Football League players
Expatriate footballers in Italy
Expatriate footballers in Germany
Expatriate footballers in Monaco
Expatriate footballers in Mexico
Expatriate footballers in Croatia
Argentine expatriate sportspeople in Croatia
Argentine expatriate sportspeople in Germany
Argentine expatriate sportspeople in Italy
Argentine expatriate sportspeople in Mexico
Argentine expatriate sportspeople in Monaco
Atlas F.C. managers
Argentine football managers